The 2006 All-SEC football team consists of American football players selected to the All-Southeastern Conference (SEC) chosen by the Associated Press (AP) and the conference coaches for the 2006 college football season.

The Florida Gators won the conference, beating the Arkansas Razorbacks 38 to 28 in the SEC Championship. The Gators then won a national championship, defeating the Big Ten champion Ohio State Buckeyes 41 to 14 in the BCS National Championship Game.

Arkansas running back Darren McFadden, a unanimous selection by both AP and the coaches, was voted the AP SEC Offensive Player of the Year. Ole Miss linebacker Patrick Willis, a unanimous selection by the coaches, was voted AP SEC Defensive Player of the Year.

Offensive selections

Quarterbacks
 JaMarcus Russell, LSU (AP-1, Coaches-1)
 Andre Woodson, Kentucky (AP-2, Coaches-2)
Chris Leak, Florida (Coaches-2)

Running backs
 Darren McFadden†, Arkansas (AP-1, Coaches-1)
 BenJarvus Green-Ellis, Ole Miss (AP-1, Coaches-2)
Kenny Irons, Auburn (AP-2, Coaches-1)
Felix Jones, Arkansas (AP-2, Coaches-2)

Wide receivers
 Robert Meachem, Tennessee (AP-1, Coaches-1)
Earl Bennett, Vanderbilt (AP-1, Coaches-2)
Dwayne Bowe, LSU (AP-2, Coaches-1)
Dallas Baker, Florida (Coaches-1)
Keenan Burton, Kentucky (AP-2, Coaches-2)
D. J. Hall, Alabama (Coaches-2)
Sidney Rice, South Carolina (Coaches-2)

Centers
Jonathan Luigs, Arkansas (AP-1, Coaches-1)
Steve Ressler, Florida (Coaches-1)
Nick Jones, Georgia (AP-2, Coaches-2)

Guards
Ben Grubbs, Auburn (AP-1, Coaches-2)
Tim Duckworth, Auburn (AP-2, Coaches-1)
Will Arnold, LSU (AP-2)
Stephen Parker,  Arkansas (AP-2)

Tackles
Arron Sears*, Tennessee (AP-1, Coaches-1)
Tony Ugoh, Arkansas (AP-1, Coaches-1)
Daniel Inman, Georgia (AP-1)
Zac Tubbs, Arkansas (AP-1, Coaches-1)
Michael Oher, Ole Miss (AP-2)
Brian Johnson, LSU (AP-2)
Phil Trautwein, Florida (Coaches-2)
Antoine Caldwell, Alabama (Coaches-2)
Michael Aitcheson, Kentucky (Coaches-2)

Tight ends
 Jacob Tamme, Kentucky (AP-1, Coaches-1)
Martrez Milner, Georgia (AP-2, Coaches-1)
Andy Boyd, South Carolina (Coaches-2)
Richard Dickson, LSU (Coaches-2)

Defensive selections

Defensive ends
 Quentin Groves, Auburn (AP-1, Coaches-1)
 Jamaal Anderson, Arkansas (AP-1, Coaches-1) 
 Turk McBride, Tennessee (AP-1) 
 Titus Brown, Miss. St (AP-2, Coaches-2) 
 Charles Johnson, Georgia (AP-2, Coaches-2) 
 Derrick Harvey, Florida (Coaches-2) 
Tyson Jackson, LSU (Coaches-2)

Defensive tackles 
Glenn Dorsey, LSU (AP-1, Coaches-1)
Ray McDonald, Florida (Coaches-1)
Keith Jackson, Arkansas (AP-2)
Deljuan Robinson, Miss. St. (AP-2)
Antwain Robinson, Arkansas (Coaches-2)

Linebackers
Patrick Willis#, Ole Miss (AP-1, Coaches-1)
Sam Olajubutu, Arkansas (AP-1, Coaches-1)
Quinton Culberson, Miss. St. (AP-1, Coaches-1)
Earl Everett, Florida (AP-2, Coaches-1)
Jasper Brinkley, South Carolina (AP-1)
Wesley Woodyard, Kentucky (Coaches-1)
Brandon Siler, Florida (AP-2, Coaches-2)
Tony Taylor, Georgia (AP-2, Coaches-2)
Will Herring, Auburn (Coaches-2)
Jonathan Goff, Vanderbilt (Coaches-2)
Ali Highsmith, LSU (Coaches-2)

Cornerbacks
 Simeon Castille, Alabama (AP-1, Coaches-1) 
Ryan Smith, Florida (AP-1, Coaches-2)
Chris Houston, Arkansas (AP-2, Coaches-2)
Jonathan Wade, Tennessee (AP-2, Coaches-2)
Fred Bennett, South Carolina (Coaches-2)
David Irons, Auburn (Coaches-2)

Safeties 
 Reggie Nelson, Florida (AP-1, Coaches-1) 
 LaRon Landry, LSU (AP-1, Coaches-1)
Tra Battle, Georgia (AP-2, Coaches-1)
Jonathan Hefney, Tennessee (AP-2, Coaches-2)
Derek Pegues, Miss. St. (Coaches-2)

Special teams

Kickers
 James Wilhoit, Tennessee (AP-1, Coaches-1)
John Vaughn, Auburn (AP-1, Coaches-1)
Ryan Succop, South Carolina (Coaches-2)

Punters
 Britton Colquitt, Tennessee (AP-1, Coaches-1)
Kody Bliss, Auburn (AP-2, Coaches-2)

All purpose/return specialist
Keenan Burton, Kentucky (AP-1)
Mikey Henderson, Georgia (Coaches-1)
Felix Jones, Arkansas (AP-2, Coaches-2)
Craig Davis, LSU (Coaches-2)

Key
Bold = Consensus first-team selection by both the coaches and AP

AP = Associated Press

Coaches = Selected by the SEC coaches

* = Unanimous selection of AP

# = Unanimous selection of Coaches

† = Unanimous selection of both AP and Coaches

See also
2006 College Football All-America Team

References

All-Southeastern Conference
All-SEC football teams